Amirhossein Bayat (born 10 May 1998) is an Iranian goalkeeper who currently plays for Esteghlal in the Persian Gulf Pro League.

Club career

Early career
Bayat started his career as a youth player at Paykan where he was invited to Iran national U-20 football team.

Persepolis
He moved to Persepolis in summer 2019, was a regular player in his first season, and wore shirt number 12 as third goalkeeper of the team.

Club career statistics
Last Update  1 July 2017

Honours
Persepolis
Persian Gulf Pro League: 2019–20

References

1998 births
Living people
Iranian footballers
Association football goalkeepers
Sportspeople from Tehran
Persepolis F.C. players
Esteghlal F.C. players
Persian Gulf Pro League players